Podhradí is a market town in Jičín District in the Hradec Králové Region of the Czech Republic. It has about 500 inhabitants.

Administrative parts
Villages of Čejkovice, Hlásná Lhota, Šlikova Ves and Vokšice are administrative parts of Podhradí.

References

Populated places in Jičín District
Market towns in the Czech Republic